Silvia Grandjean (born 27 August 1934) is a Swiss pairs skater. She had the following placements at major international championships in the early 1950s: 1951 World Championships (7th); 1952 World Championships (6th); 1953 World Championships (4th); 1954 World Championships (2nd); 1951 European Championships (4th); 1952 European Championships (4th); 1954 European Championships (1st).

Results
(pairs with Michel Grandjean)

References

External links
1952 Olympics

Swiss female pair skaters
Olympic figure skaters of Switzerland
Figure skaters at the 1952 Winter Olympics
Living people
World Figure Skating Championships medalists
European Figure Skating Championships medalists
1934 births